Polycomb group RING finger protein 5 is a protein that in humans is encoded by the PCGF5 gene.

References

Further reading